On October 8, 1950, 3rd Tank Division() was formed in Siping, Jilin province from 1st Independent Division, Northwestern Military Region.

By then he division was composed of:
5th Tank Regiment;
6th Tank Regiment;
Motorized Infantry Regiment;
Motorized Artillery Regiment.

The division was equipped with 20 Japanese-made tanks, 6 Type 90 75 mm field gun, and several trucks and vehicles and 6774 personnel.

In February 1951 the division received equipment from 2 tank self-propelled artillery regiments of Soviet Army: 60 T-34s, 12 IS-2s, 8 SU-122s, 4 T-34 tank tractors, 10 APCs, 13 repair vehicles and 100 automobiles.

On June 17, 1952, the 3rd Tank Division moved into Korea to take part in the Korean War as a part of People's Volunteer Army(CPA). During its tour to Korea, it took part in 267 battles and engagements, destroyed or damaged 22 enemy tanks and 74 aircraft.

On March 24, 1953, the division was renamed as 3rd Tank Division(note the change on Chinese characters).

From April to May 1954 the division pulled out of Korea and stayed in Siping. In November, the division was re-organized as an Army Tank Division of National Defense Force, receiving 61 more T-34s and IS-2s, and 10 light tanks to its reconnaissance battalion. The division was then composed of 5902 personnel.

In 1958 the division was re-organized as an independent tank division. All heavy tank companies and self-propelled artillery batteries were detached, and 3 more medium tank companies were attached. Motorized Infantry Regiment was renamed as Mechanized Infantry Regiment. Motorized Artillery Regiment was renamed as Howitzer Artillery Regiment.

By then he division was composed of:
5th Tank Regiment
6th Tank Regiment
Mechanized Infantry Regiment
Howitzer Artillery Regiment

The division was then equipped with 138 T-34s, 62 artillery pieces, 24 antiaircraft guns, and 5803 personnel.

In October 1962 the division was re-organized as a tank division, adding its personnel to 7690.

From August to November 1965, the division received 138 Type 59 tanks to replace all T-34s.

In January 1967 Antiaircraft Artillery Regiment activated.

From 1969 to 1970 the Antiaircraft Artillery Regiment, the 3rd Tank Division took part in Laotian Civil War to provide antiaircraft support for Chinese engineer troops. During its deployment, it shot down 4 enemy aircraft and damaged 2.

From March to May 1969 a detachment from Maintenance Battalion, 3rd Tank Division took part in the recovery of a lost Soviet Army T-62 tank during Zhenbao Island conflict. The tank is now preserved in the Military Museum of the Chinese People's Revolution.

In April 1969 321st Tank Self-Propelled Artillery Regiment from 116th Army Division and 322nd Tank Self-Propelled Artillery Regiment from 117th Army Division attached to the division. On August 18 all 4 tank regiments were renamed. By then the division was composed of:
9th Tank Regiment (former 5th Tank Regiment);
10th Tank Regiment (former 6th Tank Regiment);
11th Tank Regiment (former 321st Tank Self-Propelled Artillery Regiment);
12th Tank Regiment (former 322nd Tank Self-Propelled Artillery Regiment);
Mechanized Infantry Regiment;
Artillery Regiment;
Antiaircraft Artillery Regiment.

In May 1970 Antiaircraft Artillery Regiment was inactivated.

In March 1976 the division was converted to an army tank division, catalogue A. Its 11th Tank Regiment was detached and renamed as Tank Regiment, 39th Army Corps. Mechanized Infantry Regiment was renamed as Armored Infantry Regiment.

By then the division was composed of:
9th Tank Regiment;
10th Tank Regiment;
12th Tank Regiment;
Armored Infantry Regiment;
Artillery Regiment.

In January 1983, the division was attached to 39th Army Corps.

In February 1984, the division became a combined arms army tank division(the only other one was 6th Tank Division): Armored Infantry Regiment was renamed as Mechanized Regiment, and Antiaircraft Artillery Regiment reactivated. In October 1986 Mechanized Regiment renamed as Mechanized Infantry Regiment.

By then the division was composed of:
9th Tank Regiment;
10th Tank Regiment;
12th Tank Regiment;
Mechanized Infantry Regiment;
Artillery Regiment;
Antiaircraft Artillery Regiment.

On October 16, 1998, the division was renamed as 3rd Armored Division(). The Mechanized Infantry Regiment was disbanded and absorbed into tank regiments which became armored regiments.

By then the division was composed of:
9th Armored Regiment;
10th Armored Regiment;
12th Armored Regiment;
Artillery Regiment;
Antiaircraft Artillery Regiment.

In late 2011 the division was split into two: the division itself became 3rd Armored Brigade, while half of its battalions formed 202nd Mechanized Infantry Brigade.

In April 2017, 3rd Armored Brigade was deactivated and merged into 202nd Mechanized Infantry Brigade as 202nd Combined Arms Brigade.

Order of Battle Gallery
1955-1958:  
1958-1960: 
1960-1962: 
1962-1967: 
1967-1970: 
1970-1976: 
1976-1984: 
1984-1998: 
1998-2011:

References

坦克第3师历史，http://club.xilu.com/zgjsyj/msgview-819697-65739.html

Armoured brigades of the People's Liberation Army
Military units and formations established in 1950
Military units and formations disestablished in 2017